The following is a timeline of events of Yahoo!, an American web services provider founded in 1994.

1990s

1994
 January 1994: Jerry Yang and David Filo create "Jerry's Guide to the World Wide Web" while studying at Stanford University.
 March 1994: "Jerry's Guide to the World Wide Web" is renamed "Yahoo!."

1995
 March 2, 1995: Yahoo! is incorporated.
 August 1995: Launch of the Yahoo! commercial website that includes advertisements and news feeds from Reuters. Tim Koogle is also named CEO of Yahoo!

1996
 April 12, 1996: Yahoo! has an initial public offering, closing at US$33.00—up 270 percent from the IPO price—after peaking at US$43.00 for the day.
 September 1996: Yahoo! UK is launched.

1997
 October 8, 1997: Yahoo! acquires Four11 for about US$94 million in stock.

1998
 June 1998: Together with the ymail.com domain name, Four11's Rocketmail is incorporated into Yahoo! Mail.
 June 8, 1998: Yahoo! acquires Viaweb, co-founded by Paul Graham, for US$49 million and transforms it into Yahoo! Store.
 October 12, 1998: Yahoo! acquires direct marketing company Yoyodyne Entertainment, Inc.

1999
 January 28, 1999: Yahoo! acquires Geocities for US$4.58 billion in stock.
 April 1, 1999: Yahoo! acquires Broadcast.com for US$5.7 billion in shares.

2000s

2000
 January 3, 2000: Yahoo stocks close at an all-time high of $475.00 (pre-split price) a share. This price propelled them to the most valuable company in the world at the time. The day before, it hit an intra-day high of $500.13 (pre-split price).
 January 19, 2000: At the height of the Dot-com tech bubble, shares in Yahoo Japan became the first stocks in Japanese history to trade at over ¥100,000,000, reaching a price of 101.4 million yen ($962,140 at that time).
 February 7, 2000: Yahoo.com was brought to a halt for a few hours as it was the victim of a distributed denial of service attack (DDoS). On the next day, its shares rose by about $16, or 4.5 percent, as the failure was blamed on hackers rather than on an internal glitch, as was the case with an eBay incident earlier that year.
 May 22, 2000: In LICRA v. Yahoo!, a French judge ordered Yahoo to ban Nazi-related sites from its search engine, and to stop to act as an intermediary on bids for objects with racist overtones. Yahoo denied the French court's jurisdiction over a United States-based company, and the tribunal's requests were finally abandoned in 2003. Yahoo eventually quit voluntarily trading on Nazi and Ku Klux Klan bibelots.
 June 28, 2000: Yahoo acquires eGroups.

2001
 March 7, 2001: Yahoo CEO Tim Koogle announces he will step down and remain only a company board member.
 April 17, 2001: Terry Semel announced as the new Yahoo CEO.
 September 26, 2001: Yahoo stocks close at an all-time low of $8.11. The day before, it hit an intra-day low of $8.02 (both figures are pre-split prices).
 September 18, 2001: Hacker Adrian Lamo satirically modifies various older Yahoo! News stories, and points out security flaws. No charges are filed.
 October 2001: Yahoo! acquires Australian online auction site Sold.com from Fairfax Media and the latter gains AU$18.3 million.
 December 27, 2001: Yahoo bids $436 million for the job search engine HotJobs, defeating rival TMP Worldwide (Monster.com).

2002
 February 13, 2002: Yahoo! completes its acquisition of HotJobs.
 June 3, 2002: SBC Communications and Yahoo! launch national co-branded dial service.
 December 2002: Yahoo! starts acquisition of web search engine company Inktomi.

2003
 June 2003: BT Openworld announces an alliance with Yahoo!
 July 2003: Yahoo! acquires Overture Services, Inc.

2004
 January 19, 2004: Yahoo! announces the formation of Yahoo Research Labs, a research organization for the invention of new technologies and solutions for Yahoo! Yahoo!'s Head and Principal Scientist Dr. Gary William Flake leads the new organization.
 February 19, 2004: Yahoo! drops Google-powered results and launches its own web-crawling algorithm with its own site index.
 March 1, 2004: Yahoo announces that it will practice paid inclusion for its search service; however, it also announced that it would continue to rely mainly on a free web crawl for most of its search engine content.
 March 25, 2004: Yahoo acquires the European shopping search engine Kelkoo.
 July 9, 2004: Yahoo acquires email provider Oddpost.
 December 15, 2004: Yahoo launches beta version of its video search engine.

2005
 February 9, 2005: Yahoo! Launch is changed to Yahoo! Music, a service that provides streaming audio, music videos, Internet radio, exclusive artist features and music news.
 February 15, 2005: Yahoo! establishes its European headquarters in Dublin, Ireland and creates 400 new jobs.
 February 28, 2005: Yahoo! launches a developer network that gives an API to most of its search verticals.
 March 2005: Yahoo acquires game platform provider Stadeon.
 March 2, 2005: Yahoo completes ten years of corporate existence and free ice cream coupons are given away at U.S. Baskin-Robbins stores to its users.
 March 20, 2005: Yahoo! acquires photo sharing service Flickr and its creator Ludicorp.
 March 29, 2005: Yahoo! launch blogging and social networking service Yahoo! 360°.
 April 7, 2005: Wikimedia Foundation announces Yahoo support.
 May 26, 2005: Yahoo announces its new PhotoMail service.
 June 14, 2005: Yahoo acquires VoIP provider DialPad Communications.
 July 15, 2005: Yahoo announces Yahoo! Research Berkeley.
 July 25, 2005: Yahoo acquires widget engine software Konfabulator that is transformed into a free software platform and renamed Yahoo! Widgets.
 August 11, 2005: Yahoo acquires 40 percent of Alibaba.com for US$1 billion, and Alibaba takes over the operation of Yahoo China.
 August 23, 2005: Verizon and Yahoo launch integrated DSL service.
 September 7, 2005: Information supplied by Yahoo! to the People's Republic of China leads to the imprisonment of reporter Shi Tao, aged 37 years, for ten years. Yahoo states that it was following Chinese law.
 October 4, 2005: Yahoo! purchases online social event calendar Upcoming.org.
 October 17, 2005: Yahoo buys British location technology company Whereonearth Ltd.
 November 15, 2005: The sports section of My Yahoo! is hacked; titles such as "selfhood + conscience" and "aesthetic freedom" link to various pages at doublereflection.org.
 December 1, 2005: TiVo and Yahoo! form a partnership where several Yahoo! features can be viewed on television via the Series2 TiVo set top box.
 December 8 (U.S. time), 9 (Australian time), 2005: Australia's Seven Network combines its online, mobile and internet TV business with the local arm of Yahoo! and the commencement of Yahoo!7 is scheduled for January 2006. Yahoo!7 covered both the Australian Open tennis tournament and the Winter Olympic Games in 2006.
 December 9, 2005: Yahoo acquires del.icio.us.

2006
 January 9, 2006: Yahoo acquires WebJay.
 January 2006: Yahoo! launches Yahoo!7.
 February 12, 2006: Yahoo! Developer Network PHP Center launched.
 May 1, 2006: Yahoo! launches Yahoo! Tech.
 September 27, 2006: Yahoo! acquires online video editing site Jumpcut.
 September 29 to 30, 2006: Yahoo! hosts an Open Hack Day (including an external site) that features a musical performance by Beck.
 December 5, 2006: Yahoo! announces a significant re-organization, including the departure of Dan Rosensweig (COO), Lloyd Braun, and John Marcom. Sue Decker is promoted from CFO, and other business unit shifts are made.
 December 13, 2006: Yahoo! announces Yahoo!Xtra, a joint venture in New Zealand between its Australian joint venture Yahoo!7 and Telecom NZ.

2007
 January 8, 2007: Yahoo acquires MyBlogLog.
 February 5, 2007: Yahoo launches a new search advertising system, Panama.
 March 1, 2007: Localised New Zealand internet portal Yahoo!Xtra launches.
 March 2007: Yahoo! acquires Taiwan blogging site wretch.cc.
 April 30, 2007: Yahoo! announces acquisition of Right Media.
 June 16, 2007: Yahoo! officially retires the Yahoo! Auctions service, except in some parts of Asia.
 June 18, 2007: Yahoo! co-founder Jerry Yang replaces Terry Semel as CEO.
 June 20, 2007: Yahoo! agrees to acquire Rivals.com.
 June 28, 2007: Yahoo! UK/Ireland online auctions closes, but the Hong Kong sites are not affected.
 July 18, 2007: Yahoo acquires 35 percent stake in Indian online advertising company Tyroo Media Pvt Ltd.
 August 20, 2007: Yahoo! starts shutting down Yahoo! Photos to transition users across to Flickr—the shutdown was completed on September 20, 2007.
 August 27, 2007: Yahoo! adds SMS features to email service—users can also check travel details directly from within an email.
 September 4, 2007: Yahoo! announces acquisition of BlueLithium, a company founded by industry pioneer Gurbaksh Chahal.

2008
 February 1, 2008: Microsoft makes $44.6 billion bid for Yahoo!
 February 4, 2008: Yahoo! acquires FoxyTunes.
 February 4, 2008: Yahoo! and Rhapsody Announce Strategic Partnership in Digital Music.
 February 12, 2008: Yahoo! acquires Maven Networks, Inc.
 February 12, 2008: Yahoo! and T-Mobile Agree to Enter into Strategic Partnership.
 November 17, 2008: Yahoo! co-founder and CEO Yang steps down as CEO just 18 months after his starting date.

2009
 January 13, 2009: Carol Bartz joins Yahoo! as new CEO.
 December 2009: Announced integration with Facebook Connect.

2010s

2010
 March 2010: Yahoo! acquires sports mobile and social gaming startup Citizen Sports.  This acquisition provided a valuable mobile property as well as strong engineering and management talent.
 July 2010: Yahoo! launches mail and messenger applications for Android.
 July 2010: Yahoo! announces search alliance with Microsoft
 August 2010: Yahoo! Organic Search results replaced with Organic results from Bing
 October 2010: Yahoo! acquires Dapper.

2011
 September 6, 2011: CEO Bartz is fired.
 November 2011: Yahoo! acquires Interclick, a developer of online user behavior identification and targeting technology.

2012
 January 2012: Scott Thompson is appointed as CEO of Yahoo! following the board's September 2011 dismissal of Bartz.
 March 14, 2012: Yahoo! sues Facebook over ten patents and Facebook responds by counter-suing Yahoo!
 March 2012: Yahoo! lays off 2,000 employees.
 April 2012: Overhaul of Yahoo!'s organizational structure is announced.
 May 3, 2012: Allegations surface in regard to an error in CEO Thompson's resume.
 May 13, 2012: CEO Thompson and chairman Roy Bostock leave Yahoo! Fred Amoroso becomes chairman of the board and Ross Levinsohn is appointed interim CEO by the board of directors.
 May 21, 2012: Yahoo! sells half of its stake in Alibaba Group for US$7.1 billion in cash and stock.
June 2012: Yahoo! hires former Google director of Michael Barrett as its Chief Revenue Officer.
 In July 2012 Yahoo! Voices was hacked, compromising approximately half a million email addresses and passwords associated with Yahoo! Contributor Network.
 July 6, 2012: Yahoo! and Facebook settle their patent dispute.
 July 16, 2012: Marissa Mayer is appointed CEO.
 July 30, 2012: Levinsohn, former interim CEO, leaves Yahoo!
 September 18, 2012: Yahoo! announced the completion of the first stage of the Alibaba share repurchase. The deal is expected to net Yahoo! US$4.3 billion, and Mayer states that the board and management decided to return US$3 billion to shareholders.
 Yahoo! announces that CFO Tim Morse will be replaced by Ken Goldman on October 22, 2012.
 October 15, 2012: Henrique De Castro is hired by Yahoo! as chief operating officer.
 October 24, 2012: Yahoo! acquires Stamped.
 December 4, 2012: Yahoo! acquires OnTheAir.

2013
January 2013: Yahoo! announces it had purchased the social news start-up Snip.it.    
 March 1, 2013: Yahoo! announces that it was making some changes to the products it offers, including shutting down some while updating others. On April 1, the Yahoo! Message Boards site closed. The Yahoo! updates API were no longer supported after April 16.
 March 25, 2013: Yahoo! acquires Summly.
 April 26, 2013: Fred Amoroso announces that he is stepping down as Yahoo chairman immediately, and would be leaving the board in June 2013.
 May 16, 2013: Yahoo announces that it will begin to include relevant tweets inside their homepage news feed in a partnership with Twitter.
 May 19, 2013: The Wall Street Journal reports that Yahoo!'s board approved an all-cash deal to purchase the six-year-old blogging website Tumblr. Yahoo! will pay US$1.1 billion for Tumblr, and the company's CEO and founder David Karp will remain a large shareholder.
 May 20, 2013: The revamp of the Yahoo-owned photography service Flickr was launched in Times Square, New York, U.S. in an event that was attended by the city's mayor and a large contingency of journalists. Eleven billboards in Times Square advertised the website's new tagline “biggr, spectaculr, wherevr.” as part of the launch and Yahoo stated that it will provide Flickr users with a free terabyte of storage. The official announcement of the Tumblr acquisition was also included in the May 20 event.
 May 26, 2013: Yahoo! bids between US$600 and $800 million for video streaming site Hulu. As of May 28, 2013, Yahoo!'s videos attract 45 million unique visitors a month, while Hulu has 24 million visitors—the combination of the two audiences can place Yahoo! in the second-most popular position after Google Video.
 June 20, 2013: Yahoo! moves the official Yahoo! blog from Yahoo! Yodel to new acquisition Tumblr and uses the URL "http://yahoo.tumblr.com/."
 June 28, 2013: Yahoo! announces the scheduled closure of twelve services, including Yahoo! Axis, RSS Alerts, and Alta Vista.
 July 3, 2013: Yahoo! Acquires Xobni and appoints its former CEO, Jeff Bonforte, as Senior Vice President of Communications Products.
 July 6, 2013: The scheduled closure of May 2013 acquisition Astrid is announced. The task management service will be discontinued on August 5, 2013.
 July 6, 2013: After deactivating inactive user (login) accounts Yahoo! announces it will give them to people on a first-come, first-served basis.
 July 2013: In an insider deal, Yahoo! corporate director, Daniel Loeb sells his stock for double what he paid for it depleting Yahoo!’s cash.
 July 2013: Yahoo traffic tops Google's according to ComScore
 August 5, 2013: Yahoo launches a month-long logo change display.
 August, 2013: Tumblr will display documents related to 56 thousand emails intercepted by the National Security Agency
 August, 2013: Marissa Mayer appears on Vogue Magazine.
 August 2013: Yahoo! Groups introduces NEO (redesign).
 November 2013: Brian Pincus is seeking a class-action suit to represent non-Yahoo customers whose email address was intercepted by Yahoo!

2014
 January 3, 2014: a malicious exploit is detected in Yahoo!’s ad network by Fox-IT. Targeted at Java, the malware's first infection was dated back to December 30, 2013, and especially affected users in Romania, France, and the UK. Fox IT stated on its blog that the malware was being delivered to 300,000 Yahoo! users per hour when they discovered it.
 January 2014: Henrique De Castro, Yahoo!’s COO leaves Yahoo!
 February 11, 2014: Yahoo! acquired Wander. Wander's team of five joins Yahoo's mobile and emerging products unit in New York City.
 February 13, 2014: Yahoo! acquired Distill.
February 27, 2014: Yahoo! denies any knowledge of the interception and collection  of webcam images by GCHQ, Britain's surveillance agency, who with aid from the US NSA, intercepted Yahoo webcam images of millions of individuals not suspected of wrongdoing.
 July 11, 2014: Yahoo acquired video streaming platform RayV.
 July 21, 2014:  Yahoo announced that it is buying mobile ad company Flurry.
 August 2014: Yahoo announced that it acquires Ad startup ClarityRay.

2015
 Yahoo! Japan announces plans to buy travel booking site Ikyu for approximately $830 million.

2016
 July 25, 2016: Verizon agrees to purchase Yahoo's operating business for $4.8 billion.
 September 22, 2016: Yahoo! reports a data breach of user account data that occurred sometime in late 2014, and affected over 500 million Yahoo! user accounts − said to be the largest known data breach by then. Specific details of material taken include names, email addresses, telephone numbers, encrypted or unencrypted security questions and answers, dates of birth, and encrypted passwords. The breach used manufactured web cookies to falsify login credentials, allowing hackers to gain access to any account without a password.
 December 14, 2016: A separate data breach, occurring earlier around August 2013 is reported. This breach affected over 1 billion user accounts and is again considered the largest discovered in the history of the Internet. The data taken is similar to the data breached earlier except that it had very weak password encryption.

2017
 January 9, 2017: In a company filing  Yahoo! CEO Marissa Mayer announces she will step down from Yahoo's board of directors if its sale to Verizon goes through. She also announced that when that deal closed Yahoo! will rename itself to "Altaba".
 June 13, 2017: Yahoo! is officially acquired by Verizon. Its assets are consolidated in the subsidiary company Oath and Yahoo! ceases to exist as an independent corporate entity. CEO Mayer resigns from the company from her Tumblr account.

2018
April 20:  Yahoo sells Flickr to SmugMug.

2019
 January 8: Yahoo's parent company, Oath INC. re-brands and changes its name to Verizon Media Group.

2020s

2021
 April 6: Yahoo announces that Yahoo Answers will close its doors in May 2021.
 May 4: Yahoo Answers close services after 16 years of being active.
 May 3: Apollo Global Management, Inc enters an agreement with Verizon to acquire Verizon Media (Yahoo! and AOL Brands) for $5 billion. The new company will be known as Yahoo at the close of the deal.
 September 1: Apollo Global Management, Inc completes the acquisition of Yahoo – formerly Verizon Media.

References

External links
 Yahoo Visual Timeline 1996-2006
 http://topics.nytimes.com/top/news/business/companies/yahoo_inc/index.html

Yahoo!
Yahoo!
Yahoo!